The Man Higher Up: A Story of the Fight Which Is Life and the Force Which Is Love is a novel by the American writer Henry Russell Miller set in 19th century Pittsburgh, Pennsylvania.

The novel tells the Horatio Alger story of Bob, an Irish-Catholic tenement waif who becomes a mill hand, a ward heeler, then mayor of Pittsburgh, and finally governor of Pennsylvania.

References

1910 American novels
Novels set in Pittsburgh
Bobbs-Merrill Company books